Devante Roshard Mays (born May 26, 1994) is an American football running back who is currently a free agent. He played college football at Utah State and Blinn College.

Early years
Mays was born to Mark and Elwanda Mays in Livingston, Texas and is one of ten children the couple had together. He attended Livingston High School where he played football, ran track, and competed in power-lifting. During his senior year on the football team, he led the team to a 5–0 record and was averaging over 10 yards a carry. However, during the sixth game of the year he suffered a foot injury that ended his season prematurely.  He finished the season with 600 rushing yards on 58 carries with 10 touchdowns. His injury in addition to a non-qualifying academic status left him no recruiting offers despite his performance.

College career

Community College
Mays graduated from Livingston High School and with the lack of recruiting offers on the table, chose to attend and play for Tyler Junior College. During his first carry with the school, he ran for a touchdown. However, his time there proved to be short lived as an off the field incident lead to his dismissal from the school and the team.  Feeling that his football career was over, he took a job working construction and taking courses at a nearby campus of his hometown.

After a chance meeting with his former high school coach, he was able to return to the gridiron after a call earned him an invitation to a scouting combine at Blinn College, which invited him to return to school. He redshirted his first year with the team. However, following that season the head coach of the team, Ronny Feldon was fired and Mays found himself sitting on the bench without an opportunity to play in a very pass-oriented offense. Almost to the point where he quit the team, he soon received his opportunity as two other running backs were removed from the team leaving him as the de facto starter. During this time he ran for 557 rushing yards and three touchdowns in six games, allowing him to catch the attention of Utah State.

Utah State
Following a visit to the Utah State campus,  Mays claimed he had "fell in love with the place" and after receiving interest from a few more places decided to commit to the school. He opted to major in interdisciplinary studies, emphasizing health and wellness. As a junior with the team, he played in all 13 games and started six of them. He found success early on the field as his first Division I run went for 36 yards. He finished the year with 165 carries for 966 yards and nine touchdowns, leading the team in every category.

Mays continued on for his senior year with the team by playing in six games and starting two of them, but was limited after suffering a knee injury against USC in the second game of the season.

Professional career
Mays was projected as a seventh round pick by Lance Zierlein of NFL.com. He was praised for his physical stature and his hard running stance, being willing to power through contact. He was also praised for his attitude and work ethic. Zierlein also expressed concern about his reoccurring injury history and his hesitation for hitting certain running lanes.

Green Bay Packers
Mays was drafted by the Green Bay Packers in the seventh round, 238th overall, in the 2017 NFL Draft. He was signed to a four-year contract on May 5, 2017.

On November 19, against the Baltimore Ravens, Mays had his first three career carries, which totaled −1 yard. In the season finale against the Detroit Lions, he had one carry for two yards. Overall, in his rookie season, he appeared in eight games and had four carries for one rushing yard to go along with three receptions for no receiving yards.

On September 1, 2018, Mays was placed on injured reserve, and was later released with an injury settlement.

Cleveland Browns
Mays was signed to the Cleveland Browns' practice squad on October 23, 2018. The Browns signed Mays to a futures contract on January 2, 2019. Mays was released by the Browns on May 13, 2019.

Jacksonville Jaguars
On July 31, 2019, Mays was signed by the Jacksonville Jaguars. He was placed on injured reserve on August 31, 2019.

NFL career statistics

Regular season

References

External links
Utah State Aggies bio 

1994 births
Living people
People from Livingston, Texas
Players of American football from Texas
American football running backs
Blinn Buccaneers football players
Utah State Aggies football players
Green Bay Packers players
Cleveland Browns players
Jacksonville Jaguars players